Blairs Ridge is a ridge in West Virginia, in the United States.

Blairs Ridge has the name of J. M. Blair, a local preacher.

References

Ridges of Marshall County, West Virginia
Ridges of West Virginia